Steeple Jason Island is a small island west of Grand Jason Island. It is a part of the Jason Islands in the Falkland Islands. Along with Grand Jason, it is one of the "Islas los Salvajes" in Spanish (the Jasons being divided into two groups in that language).

Population and geography
None of the Jason Islands has ever been properly inhabited. Steeple Jason was used for sheep grazing up until the 1980s. There are the remains of a shearing shed on the island. There is also Steinhart Station, a field research station on the island, built in 2003 for monitoring wildlife.

The island is surrounded by low-lying land around the shore which quickly rises to a steep peak, hence the island's name.

The island was formerly owned by New York philanthropist Michael Steinhardt, who later donated it to the Bronx Zoo-based Wildlife Conservation Society.

Wildlife
Steeple Jason is home to the largest colony of black-browed albatrosses in the world. Over 70% of the global population of black-browed albatross breed in the Falkland Islands.

Other birdlife includes southern rockhopper penguins, Magellanic penguins, gentoo penguins, slender-billed prions, striated caracaras and tussac-birds. The Magellanic penguin is near the southern part of its range here, but the more cold-tolerant gentoo also occurs substantially south into Antarctica. The sole mammalian life is marine, e.g. sea lions and fur seals.

Large beds of kelp surround the island, and the land is covered in grasses common to the other Falkland Islands, such as tussac grass.

Birds and other wildlife on Steeple Jason Island are in many cases under threat, chiefly due to overfishing in the South Atlantic Ocean over the last century.

References 
 John Fowler. 1999. Steeple Jason Island, Falkland Islands
 The Blue Planet, BBC, 2001.
 C. Michael Hogan. 2008. Magellanic Penguin, GlobalTwitcher.com, ed. N. Stromberg
 Alex Kirby. 2002. BBC: Safe Haven for albatrosses (6 March 2002)
 Wildlife Conservation Society. 2008. WCS in the Falkland Islands

Footnotes

Jason Islands
Uninhabited islands of the Falkland Islands
Seabird colonies
Penguin colonies